The  Oakland Raiders season was the franchise's 43rd season in the National Football League and the 53rd overall. It was the first season under head coach Dennis Allen, who replaced Hue Jackson, who was fired one week after the 2011 season ended. It was also the first full season without the ownership of longtime owner Al Davis, who died on October 8, 2011, and the first season with a non-Davis family member as the general manager since , as Reggie McKenzie was hired from the Green Bay Packers' organization by Al Davis' son Mark on January 10 to be the GM of the team, and was given full autonomy over the football operations. McKenzie fired Jackson on his first day and hired Allen 2 weeks later. The Raiders failed to improve on their 8–8 record in 2011, securing them into their tenth consecutive non-winning season and the tenth consecutive elimination from postseason contention. The Raiders also clinched their divisional rank, securing their fifth consecutive season since 2007 which they finished third or fourth. This was also the first time since the 2009 NFL Season that the team finished with a record below 8-8. The team did however upset the Pittsburgh Steelers, whom they also defeated in the 2006 NFL Season, when the Raiders finished the year 2–14 and claimed the first overall pick in the draft.

Personnel changes
 On January 3, local radio show – 95.7 The Game – reported that the Raiders had fired their entire defensive staff following a season with some of the worst defensive stats in franchise history. The radio show claimed that defensive coordinator Chuck Bresnahan had been fired along with all his assistants, among them linebackers coach Greg Biekert, cornerbacks coach Rod Woodson and safeties coach Aaron Ross. When approached for comment, then Raiders' senior executive John Herrera was quoted as saying ' that's not accurate '. On January 5, a follow-up report by NBC's Pro Football Talk reporter Gregg Rosenthal confirmed that the Raiders would be firing their entire defensive staff. The supposed earlier denial by John Herrera was clarified and that the Raiders had informed all of the concerned coaches that they would not be brought back, but would be required to complete the remaining two weeks of their contracts.

 On January 6, the Raiders announced that then current Green Bay Packers director of football operations Reggie McKenzie, would become their new general manager. The hiring was confirmed at a news conference on January 10. McKenzie had spent 4 seasons with the then Los Angeles Raiders as a player from 1985 to 1988. He began his career as a front office executive with the Packers in 1994 as a Pro Personnel Assistant and steadily rose through the ranks, eventually overseeing all of the Packers' scouting efforts and player evaluations as well as being heavily involved in the Packers' drafting decisions. McKenzie will become the first person besides the late Al Davis to hold the position of general manager since Davis assumed the role in 1972.
 On January 10, at an official news conference introducing Reggie McKenzie as the new GM, McKenzie conducted his first act in the capacity of GM by announcing that the Raiders would be parting ways with Head Coach Hue Jackson after only one season in the job. Jackson had arrived in 2010 as the team's offensive coordinator under then head coach Tom Cable and swiftly turned the Raiders' offense into one of the league's highest-scoring offenses. Jackson was then promoted to the position of head coach after Al Davis had fired Tom Cable at the end of the 2010 season. McKenzie cited the need to start anew as the reason for firing Jackson, stating ' I felt there was a need for change at the head-coaching position, from the top. We're moving into a new era. No disrespect to Coach Jackson, but this was something I wanted to do, start anew. ' 
 On January 22, current Defensive Line coach Mike Waufle was allowed to leave the Raiders and take up the same position with the St. Louis Rams. Waufle had been a widely respected coach within the team and received regular praise from veteran defensive linemen Richard Seymour.
 On January 27, 3 days after the first reports were made, the Raiders officially announced Dennis Allen as their new head coach, replacing the fired Hue Jackson. Allen had been the current division rival Denver Broncos' defensive coordinator. At 39, Allen becomes one of the youngest Head Coaches in the league. As defensive coordinator he had helped turn the Broncos' worst-ranked defense into an aggressive, solid unit in 2011. Allen was signed to a four-year deal and becomes the first defensive-minded head coach hired by the Raiders since the hiring of legendary coach John Madden. GM Reggie McKenzie has promised Allen the freedom to pick and choose his own assistants and have a say on player signings and drafting, input that very few of the Raiders' head coaches had had in the Al Davis era.

 On February 2, the Raiders announced the hiring of current Houston Texans' quarterbacks coach Greg Knapp as their new offensive coordinator. Knapp took over from Al Saunders, who was reassigned within the Raiders' coaching structure. Knapp had a previous stint with the Raiders in 2007 and 2008, where he helped the Raiders become one of the league's best rushing teams as they ranked 6th and 10th respectively. Knapp also became the first assistant coach to be hired by Allen in his capacity as head coach.
 On February 2, the Raiders hired Frank Pollack as their new offensive line coach. Pollack had previously coached the Houston Texans' offensive line for the past 5 seasons and helped create a rushing offense that had ranked in the top two over the past two seasons. Pollack is schooled in the Zone Blocking philosophy that the Raiders are looking to implement.
 On February 6, the Raiders announced the hiring of Jason Tarver as their new defensive coordinator and replacement for the fired Chuck Bresnahan. Tarver had previously spent a decade with the San Francisco 49ers as a defensive assistant before moving to Stanford, where he became a co-defensive coordinator and inside linebackers coach. During his time with the Cardinal, he coached on a defense that was ranked either 1st or 2nd in every major rush defense category.
 On February 8, the Raiders announced that veteran offensive coach Al Saunders would be staying with the team in his new role as Senior Offensive Assistant. Saunders, who had spent 2011 as the Raiders' Offensive Coordinator under Hue Jackson, was allowed to interview for other posts – notably for the Kansas City Chiefs' vacant Offensive Coordinator's job – but instead returned to the team.
 On February 14, the Raiders announced the hiring of six assistants; quarterbacks coach John DeFilippo – returning for his second stint with the Raiders -, defensive backs coaches Johnnie Lynn & Clayton Lopez, tight ends coach Mark Hutson, wide receivers coach Ted Gilmore and Defensive Line coach Terrell Williams. Hutson, Gilmore and Williams are all making their first coaching appearances in the NFL. Hutson had been a tight ends and offensive line coach at the collegiate level since 1990, recently working with Tulane. Gilmore had previously worked under ex-Raider Head Coach Lane Kiffin at USC, and Terrell Williams had been a defensive line coach and co-defensive coordinator for Texas A&M.
 On February 17, the Raiders and long-serving Senior Executive John Herrera agreed on a mutual separation. Herrera had joined the team in 1963 as an errand runner and would go on to hold a position of considerable power within the organisation that saw him oversee media and public relations as well as personnel and business decisions. He formed a close friendship with Al Davis over the years. Noted for being a controversial figure at times, he was characterised by his confrontational personality, culminating in a physical exchange with San Jose Mercury News columnist Tim Kawakami in 2008. Herrera later announced his retirement from football.

Roster changes

Free agents

Signings

Trades
On March 30, the Raiders traded offensive lineman Bruce Campbell to the Carolina Panthers in exchange for running back/kickoff returner Mike Goodson. The deal came about due to the Raiders' need to fill the void left behind after the departure of Michael Bush in Free Agency.
On July 23, the Raiders traded wide receiver Louis Murphy to the Carolina Panthers for a conditional late round draft pick.

2012 draft class

The Raiders did not have first-, second-, third-, fourth- or seventh-round selections heading into the 2012 NFL Draft due to the following trades:
 Their first-round selection and a conditional 2013 selection were traded to the Cincinnati Bengals in exchange for QB Carson Palmer.
 Their second-round selection and a 2011 seventh-round selection were traded to the New England Patriots in exchange for third and fourth-round selections in 2011.
 Their third-round selection was forfeited after selecting QB Terrelle Pryor in the 2011 Supplemental Draft.
 Their fourth-round selection was traded to the Washington Redskins in exchange for QB Jason Campbell.
 Their seventh-round selection and a conditional 2013 selection were traded to the Seattle Seahawks in exchange for LB Aaron Curry.

Draft

Undrafted free agents
All undrafted free agents were signed following the conclusion of the 2012 NFL Draft on April 28.

Staff

Final roster

Schedule

Preseason

Regular season

Note: Intra-division opponents are in bold text.

Game summaries

Week 1: vs. San Diego Chargers

With the loss, the Raiders began their season 0–1.

Week 2: at Miami Dolphins

With the loss, the Raiders fell to 0–2.

Week 3: vs. Pittsburgh Steelers

With the win, the Raiders improved to 1–2. The Pittsburgh Steelers would end up being the only AFC North team Oakland defeated during the 2012 season.

Week 4: at Denver Broncos

With the loss, the Raiders went into their bye week at 1–3.

Week 6: at Atlanta Falcons

With the surprising loss, the Raiders fell to 1–4.

Week 7: vs. Jacksonville Jaguars

With the win, the Raiders improved to 2–4.

Week 8: at Kansas City Chiefs

With the win, the Raiders improved to 3–4.

Week 9: vs. Tampa Bay Buccaneers

With the loss, the Raiders fell to 3–5.

Week 10: at Baltimore Ravens

With the loss, the Raiders fell into 3–6.

Week 11: vs. New Orleans Saints

With the loss, the Raiders fell to 3–7.

Week 12: at Cincinnati Bengals

The Raiders' loss drops their record to 3–8 and secures them their tenth consecutive non-winning campaign. This was Carson Palmer's first game against his former team, the Bengals, who he played for 8 years from 2003–2010.

Week 13: vs. Cleveland Browns

With the loss, the Raiders dropped to 3–9 and have therefore been eliminated from playoff contention. This would become the first road victory for the Cleveland Browns since Week 2 of the 2011 season, and the first television blackout for the Raiders since Week 16 of the 2010 season.

Week 14: vs. Denver Broncos

With the loss, the Raiders dropped to 3–10.

Week 15: vs. Kansas City Chiefs

The Raiders pitched a shutout for the first time since Week 17 of the 2002 Season against the Chiefs. With the win, the Raiders improved to 4–10 and avoided last place in the AFC West by virtue of a head-to-head sweep over the Chiefs (2–12).

Week 16: at Carolina Panthers

With the loss, the Raiders dropped their record to 4-11. The Raiders were swept by the NFC South.

Week 17: at San Diego Chargers

With the loss, the Raiders finished the season by 4-12.

Standings

References

External links
 

Oakland Raiders seasons
R00
Oakland
Oakland